The 2013 Cholet Pays de Loire Dames was the 10th edition of a one-day women's cycle race held in Cholet, France on March 17 2013. The tour has an UCI rating of 1.2. The race was won by Emma Johansson of the Australian-based team, Orica–AIS.

See also
 2013 in women's road cycling

References

2013 in French sport
2013 in women's road cycling
Cholet Pays de Loire Dames